York-based rock band Elliot Minor have released two studio albums, one acoustic album, one extended play (EP), 10 singles and 12 music videos.

Albums

Studio albums

Other albums

Extended plays

Singles

Videography

Music videos

References

Discographies of British artists